Yenimahalle Belediyesi SK is a multi-sports club established 1986 in Ankara, Turkey and sponsored by the Municipality of Yenimahalle. The club is best known for its women's handball team.

The club has sports branches in football, basketball, handball, boxing, kickboxing, Muay Thai, athletics and swimming.

References